Andreas Michalakopoulos (17 May 1876, in Patras – 7 March 1938, in Athens) was an important liberal politician in the inter-war period who served as Prime Minister of Greece from 7 October 1924 to 26 June 1925.

He was a senior member of the Liberal Party and a close associate of its founder, the Greek statesman Eleftherios Venizelos, for more than 20 years. With Venizelos he participated in the negotiations for the international treaties of Sèvres and Lausanne, and co-signed as Foreign Minister the Greek-Turkish Friendship Convention (also known as the Treaty of Ankara) on 30 October 1930.

He held important posts in several governments led by Eleftherios Venizelos, Alexandros Zaimis and Konstantinos Tsaldaris; Foreign Minister (1928–33), Minister for Economy (1912–916), Minister for Agriculture (1917–1918, 1920), Minister for Military Affairs (1918).

Opposed to the military dictatorship of Ioannis Metaxas, he was sent to political exile on Paros in 1936, which resulted in his death in 1938.

He was buried in the First Cemetery of Athens.

See also
Incident at Petrich
Honorary Knight Commander of the Order of the British Empire

References

External links
Andreas Michalakopoulos portrait painting (currently in the Greek Parliament)
Greece, Inter War Period 1923–1940 (Hellenic History on the Internet)
Greece, 1923–1928 (National Research Foundation "E.Venizelos")

1876 births
1938 deaths
20th-century prime ministers of Greece
Politicians from Patras
Foreign ministers of Greece
Agriculture ministers of Greece
Ministers of Military Affairs of Greece
Prime Ministers of Greece
Honorary Knights Commander of the Order of the British Empire
Grand Crosses of the Order of the White Lion
Liberal Party (Greece) politicians
Burials at the First Cemetery of Athens
Finance ministers of Greece
MPs of Achaea